373rd or 373d may refer to:

373d Fighter Group, inactive United States Army Air Force unit
373d Intelligence, Surveillance and Reconnaissance Group (ISRG), an Air Force Intelligence, Surveillance and Reconnaissance Agency unit located at Misawa AB, Japan
373d Strategic Missile Squadron, inactive United States Air Force unit
373rd (Croatian) Infantry Division (Wehrmacht), a division of the German Army during World War II

See also
373 (number)
373, the year 373 (CCCLXXIII) of the Julian calendar
373 BC